Leo de Boer (born 1953) is a Dutch film director. He is also a lecturer at Utrecht School of the Arts in Utrecht, the Netherlands.

De Boer studied History at the University of Amsterdam followed by four years at the Dutch Film Academy. He has worked as film editor at NOS Dutch National Television, and is a lecturer at the Utrecht School of the Arts (HKU). He has done documentary screenplay coaching at the International Documentary Film Festival Amsterdam workshop for docu-development.

He is the screenwriter and director of several documentaries and feature films. His work includes TV-documentaries like The Road to Bresson, Angels of Death (awarded the 'Golden Calf' as the best documentary at the Dutch Film Festival), Under Moscow, The Train to Grozny and feature-length documentaries like The Red Stuff and Closing in on Tanja.

List of documentary films
 Roes (2019)
 Boudewijn Büch, verdwaald tussen feit en fictie (2016)
 Paradijs in Moskou (2014)
 Circushart (2012)
 Ik wil mijn geld terug (2012)
 Helene, een vrouw tussen liefde en kunst (2011)
 Dichter bij Tanja (2010)
 Bikkel (2009)
 De rode jaren (2005)
 Onder Moskou (2001)
 De trein naar Grozny (2000)
 The red stuff (1999)
 Dromen in Oktober (1999)
 Engelen des doods (1997)
 De Ruslui (1996)
 Op het Noorden (1994)
 For Anne Lovett 1968–1984 (1987)
 In de ban van sirenen (1978)

Freelance film editing on documentary films:
 Birthplace Unknown (1988) by director Karin Junger
 Procedure 769, witness to an execution (1995) by director Jaap van Hoewijk

References

External links
 
 

1953 births
Living people
Dutch film directors
Film educators
Screenwriting instructors
Academic staff of the Utrecht School of the Arts
People from Amstelveen
University of Amsterdam alumni